James Joseph Stuart, known as J. J. or Joe Stuart (9 June 1904 – 21 March 1980) was the 19th president of the Gaelic Athletic Association.

Born in Ogonnelloe, County Clare,  he won two Fitzgibbon Cup medals with UCD and also hurled in Clare, Galway and Limerick.

He was a medical doctor and was Master of Dublin's Coombe Hospital from 1957 to 1963.

He served as vice-chairman of Dublin county committee for many years and in 1954 became the only non-Leinster man to chair the Leinster Council.

He was also a prominent hurling referee who took charge of the 1943 All-Ireland Senior Hurling Championship Final between Cork and Antrim.

References

 

1980 deaths
1904 births
All-Ireland Senior Hurling Championship Final referees
Chairmen of Gaelic games governing bodies 
Dublin County Board administrators
Gaelic games players from County Clare
Hurling referees
Leinster Provincial Council administrators
Presidents of the Gaelic Athletic Association
20th-century Irish medical doctors